Allianz MTV Stuttgart is a German volleyball team based in Stuttgart, Baden-Württemberg.

In 2020, sports director was Kim Renkema whereas managing director was Aurel Irion.

For the 2020-21 season, Stuttgart re-hired Athina Papafotiou and also kept Krystal Rivers who had been an important building block. Further, the Dutch girl Hester Jasper (18) joined from German Women's Volleyball League competitor VfB Suhl. The attacker signed a two-year contract. Yet, Stuttgart had to cope with the departure of Annie Cesar, who left to get more playing time. 

As of 2021, the head coach has been Tore Aleksandersen  who replaced 2020 coach Giannis Athanasopoulos.

Titles and accomplishments

National competitions
German Women's Volleyball League
 : 2018–19, 2021–22
 : 2014–15, 2015–16, 2016–17, 2017–18, 2020–21 
German Women's Volleyball Cup
 : 2011, 2015, 2017, 2022
German Women's Volleyball Supercup
 : 2016

International competitions
  Women's CEV Cup
 : 2021–22

Team roster 2022–23 

As of December 2022.

References

German volleyball clubs
Volleyball clubs established in 2007
Sport in Stuttgart